Kaldo may refer to:

Kaldo Kalm,  Estonian ice sledge hockey player.
Chaldea, Aramaic transliteration of ܟܠܕܘ, Kaldo
Hiligaynon language term for 'broth'
Kaldo converter, a rotary oxygen based steelmaking process